Saima Azhar, is a Pakistani film actress and model. She was a contestant in ARY Digital's stunt game show Madventures Season 2.

Saima was introduced to the modeling industry by her friend in 2011. She won Miss Photogenic Award at Veet Miss Super Model 2011. She was awarded Lux Style Award for “Best Talent of the Year” in 2013. Face of PIA Uniforms 2017.

Early life and career 
Azhar did her master's degree in physiology before she entered in modeling career. “I never thought I would be a model one day or even considered it as an option, but lady luck just smiled upon me,” says Azhar. Azhar participated in the second season of ARY Digital's reality game show Madventures. She also made her film debut with action thriller Pakistani film Raasta.

Filmography

Television

References

External links
 , Retrieved 3 May 2017

Living people
20th-century Pakistani actresses
21st-century Pakistani actresses
Actresses from Karachi
Pakistani film actresses
Punjabi people
1980 births